John Allen Campbell (January 20, 1952 – June 13, 1993) was an American blues guitarist, singer, and songwriter.

Biography
Campbell was born and grew up in Shreveport, Louisiana, United States.

His first group was the Texas-based electric power trio, Junction. Formed in 1973 in Corpus Christi, Texas, the band consisted of John on guitar and vocals, Tim Delaney on bass and vocals, and Jack "Satch" Haupt on drums and vocals. The trio disbanded two years later. Campbell cut his first album titled Street Suite around this same time.

At the eve of the 1980s, he spent a time at the Robin Hood Studios in Tyler, Texas, and taped a demo with his acoustic versions of blues standards. In 2000, these twelve tracks were issued as the compilation album, Tyler, Texas Session.

As a solo artist, Campbell continued to play in clubs of East Texas and he also appeared in New Orleans, Louisiana. In 1985, he moved to New York City, New York, and joined the local blues scene.

His album, A Man And His Blues, featured Ronnie Earl as producer and guest guitarist, was recorded during two days in April 1988, and was released on a small German record label. Its follow-up releases were on Elektra, One Believer (1991) and Howlin Mercy (1993). His "When the Levee Breaks," was a cover of the country blues song written and first recorded by Kansas Joe McCoy and Memphis Minnie in 1929 and covered also by Led Zeppelin.

Campbell's favored instruments were a 1952 Gibson Southern Jumbo acoustic, a 1934 National Steel and a 1940s National resophonic guitar.

Death
On June 13, 1993, Campbell died from a heart attack as he slept at his Manhattan home in New York City. He was 41. He was survived by his wife, Dolly Fox; a daughter, Paris; a daughter, Elizabeth; a sister, Ellen Searcey; a brother, William, and his father, John.

Album discography
1975: Street Suite (Sync)
1988: A Man And His Blues (Cross Cut)
1991: One Believer (Elektra)
1993: Howlin Mercy (Elektra)
2000: Tyler, Texas Session (Sphere Sound)

See also
Delta blues

References

External links
Another MySpace Tribute Page more focused on his last album
John Campbell discography at discogs.com

1952 births
1993 deaths
Musicians from Shreveport, Louisiana
American blues guitarists
American male guitarists
American blues singers
Songwriters from Louisiana
20th-century American singers
Writers from Shreveport, Louisiana
20th-century American guitarists
Singers from Louisiana
Guitarists from Louisiana
20th-century American male musicians
American male songwriters